The Woodstock Warren Through Truss Bridge was a historic iron bridge that carried Bridges Road (Town Highway 24) across the Ottauquechee River in western Woodstock, Vermont.  The bridge was built in 1925, and was a rare example of the state of a double-intersection Warren through truss.  The bridge was swept away by flooding caused by Hurricane Irene in 2011; it was listed on the National Register of Historic Places in 1992.

Description and history
The Woodstock Warren Through Truss Bridge stood in western Woodstock, roughly midway between the villages of West Woodstock and Bridgewater. The Ottauquechee River flows east in this area, and its route is closely paralleled on the north by U.S. Route 4. On the southern side of the river, Bridges Road runs west from the West Woodstock Bridge, and now ends at the point where this bridge once stood. The bridge's supporting Warren trusses deviated from typical instances of the form by having additional diagonal members that increased the bridge's carrying capacity.

The bridge was probably built in 1925, when the town was making a number of improvements to its transportation infrastructure. The bridge survived Vermont's devastating floods of 1927, but was washed away in 2011 by floods caused by the remnants of Hurricane Irene.

See also
National Register of Historic Places listings in Windsor County, Vermont
List of bridges on the National Register of Historic Places in Vermont

References

Bridges on the National Register of Historic Places in Vermont
National Register of Historic Places in Windsor County, Vermont
Bridges completed in 1925
Bridges in Windsor County, Vermont
Buildings and structures in Woodstock, Vermont
Iron bridges in the United States
Warren truss bridges in the United States
Road bridges in Vermont
1925 establishments in Vermont
2011 disestablishments in Vermont